was a town located in Higashiusuki District, Miyazaki Prefecture, Japan.

As of 2003, the town had an estimated population of 5,025 and the density of 22.97 persons per km². The total area was 218.73 km².

On February 25, 2006, Tōgō was merged into the expanded city of Hyūga and no longer exists as an independent municipality.

Tōgō literally means "east shire". This town was an eastern quarter of so-called Irigo (literally Inlands Shire) area.

History
The town was established in 1889 by merging the villages (now hamlets) of Shimosanga, Yamage, Tsuboya and Yaebaru-Sakonouchi; which later was elevated to town status in 1969.

External links
Official website of Hyūga

Dissolved municipalities of Miyazaki Prefecture